The Embassy of the Republic of China (Taiwan) in Honduras is the embassy of the Republic of China (ROC; commonly called Taiwan) in Tegucigalpa, Honduras. The two countries have had diplomatic relations since 1941. Honduras is one of the 14 countries that recognise the ROC.

The embassy also has responsibility for Costa Rica and Nicaragua. Both of these countries had switched their diplomatic relations to the People's Republic of China in 2007 and 2021 respectively.

Its counterpart body in Taiwan is the Embassy of Taiwan in Tegucigalpa.

History
Diplomatic relations were established between the two countries on 9 April 1941, and the exchange of ministers between the two countries began in the form of joint control by the legation in Panama. In June 1957, the Legation of the Republic of China in Honduras was established in Tegucigalpa, and in 1962, the Minister Extraordinary and Plenipotentiary began to reside there. On 20 May 1965, the Embassy of the Republic of China in Honduras was inaugurated in the form of mutual promotion with the Legation of the Republic of China in Honduras.

See also
Honduras–Taiwan relations
List of diplomatic missions of Taiwan
List of diplomatic missions in Honduras
Taipei Economic and Cultural Representative Office

References

Honduras
Taiwan